Yair Andrés Ibargüen Murillo (born 3 May 1993) is a Colombian footballer who currently plays as a defender.

Career statistics

Club

Notes

References

1993 births
Living people
Colombian footballers
Colombian expatriate footballers
Association football defenders
Paraguayan Primera División players
Categoría Primera B players
Categoría Primera A players
Club Olimpia footballers
Boyacá Chicó F.C. footballers
C.D. Águila footballers
Expatriate footballers in Paraguay
Colombian expatriate sportspeople in Paraguay
Expatriate footballers in El Salvador
Colombian expatriate sportspeople in El Salvador
21st-century Colombian people